The procurator or procurator general (Generalprokurator) of the Teutonic Knights was a position in their Monastic State of Prussia. The procurator was responsible for the court matters and administration of a specific region called a procuratoria, as well as commanding the army.
As a commander, the procurator had brothers of the Teutonic Knights and vassal Old Prussians at his disposal. Procurators were under the direct command of the komturs.

References
 vol. 1: Die Geschichte der Generalprokuratoren von den Anfängen bis 1403. 1961.
 vol. 2: Peter von Wormditt (1403–1419). 1960.
 vol. 3: Johann Tiergart (1419–1428)
 1st half-vol.: 1419–1423. 1966.
 2nd half-vol.: 1424–1428. 1971.
 vol. 4: 1429–1436
 1st half-vol.: 1429–1432. 1973.
 2nd half-vol.: 1433–1436. 1976.

Teutonic Order